The 2020s commodities boom refers to the rise of many commodity prices in the early 2020s following the COVID-19 pandemic.  The COVID-19 recession initially made commodity prices drop, but lockdowns, supply chain bottlenecks, and dovish monetary policy limited supply and created excess demand causing a commodity super cycle rise.

The 2022 Russian invasion of Ukraine worsened the bottlenecks, creating the 2022-2023 Russia–European Union gas dispute and the 2021 United Kingdom natural gas supplier crisis, contributing to the 2021–2023 global energy crisis. As Russia and Belarus are major fertilizer exporters and natural gas is a primary component in many fertilizers, fertilizer prices rose accordingly, starting the 2022-2023 food crises.

The previous commodity super cycle was the 2000s commodities boom, which was attributed to emerging markets, especially that of China, providing a high demand for raw materials.

Food

Global food shortages already existed due to the COVID-19 pandemic when, during the 2022 Russian invasion of Ukraine, Russia blockaded the Port of Odesa, preventing grain exports. Ukraine is known as the breadbasket of Eastern Europe because of its fertile soil and exports of wheat, corn, and sunflower oil.

Turkey and the United Nations brokered the Black Sea Grain Initiative between Russia and Ukraine, allowing the controlled export of grain through the Port to the Black Sea, though shipments have yet to reach prewar levels.

Natural gas is in most fertilizers, and fertilizer prices rose due to the Russia–European Union gas dispute, contributing to the food crises.

Oats

Hectares of oats are down in North America along with droughts in the United States is limiting supply. Demand is up around the world for oats and 38.5% in one year for East Asia.

Orange juice
Orange juice prices have been close to an all time high in 2022 because of Hurricanes Ian and Nicole.  Citrus greening disease has been causing damage to citrus trees in the United States since 1998 when it was discovered, dropping the orange production by half.

Lumber

Lumber prices increased with the hot housing market. Potential new American tariffs of 17.99% on Canadian lumber also sent the price higher.  Those tariffs were finalized lower to 11.64% by the Biden Administration.  New contracts that allow semi trucks to haul contracts instead of just rail cars starting August 8, 2022, potentially contributing to normalization of prices in the second half of 2022.  Mortgage interest rates rising with inflation is another reason for cooling housing demand and consequently lumber as well.

Natural gas

Natural gas prices have increased around the world. In Europe, Russia has invaded Ukraine and Europe is very dependent on Russia for natural gas via pipelines. Russia has economically weaponized natural gas and reduced flows on pipelines like the Nord Stream 1. Natural gas prices had been increasing worldwide before the invasion of Ukraine and increased substantially thereafter; in some areas, the price of gas has increased more than tenfold.

Natural gas recently became more of a global market with liquefied natural gas and LNG ships maturing in size with Qatar being a world leader in exporting LNG.  This globalization of this fungible commodity has caused the prices to shadow each other more in different markets. Previously, natural gas was more difficult to ship, and required pipeline infrastructure, which generally can only be emplaced on land, or for relatively short distances undersea. With the increased use of LNG, gas can be shipped by sea, albeit with the requirement of specialized port facilities.

Piped natural gas

Piped natural gas prices have been rising steadily throughout the U.S. since 2020 but California has experienced exceptionally higher prices because of bad weather, a pipe explosion on the El Paso Natural Gas pipeline, unscheduled maintenance, and the Aliso Canyon gas leak at the storage facility in the past so it stores less now.

Crude oil and petroleum products

Crude oil prices dropped dramatically during the first months of the COVID Pandemic (WTI went negative for a day) and production was cut in anticipation of a prolonged slowdown. Demand soon exceeded supply because of loose monetary policy causing a global energy crisis and prices to rise.  Russia's invasion of Ukraine also resulted in price increases due to sanctions and trade restrictions.

Jet Fuel

Kerosene jet fuel refining has to compete with Diesel fuel and gasoline at the refineries when refining petroleum products.  Jet fuel topped $5 a gallon in 2022.

Kerosene heating oil #1
Kerosene heating oil was approaching $4 dollars per gallon in March 2022.  The EIA stopped reporting the data in March 2022.

Diesel heating oil #2
Diesel heating oil went from around $2 before the pandemic to almost $5 a gallon in 2022.  The prices have peaked and are falling in 2022.

Electricity

Electricity prices rose in the United States through 2021 and 2022 mostly from the increase in natural gas prices which makes up the 35% of electricity generated in the United States

Lithium

The price of lithium carbonate started to rise in 2021 after slumping in 2020 and peaked in early 2022 close to $80,000 per ton. Demand for electric vehicles around the world is the primary cause for the price rise. In 2021, electric vehicle sales doubled to 6.6 million from 2020.

Copper

The price of copper rose through 2021 and peaked close to $5 per pound in Q2 2022 before retreating.  Copper demand is expected to double from 25 million metric tonnes in 2022 to over 50 MMT by the year 2035.

Nickel

In March 2022 nickel prices spiked higher over fear of the 2022 Russian invasion of Ukraine as Russia produced 15.2% of world nickel in 2021.

Tin
Prices of tin were up 79% in 2021 because of high demand for circuit boards.

Titanium

Demand for titanium is high because defense spending increases on and resulting from the Russo-Ukrainian War, parts for aircraft makers and defense contractors; additionally, automotive industry demand for titanium dioxide pigments remains high.

Rolled Steel
Hot-rolled steel prices hit close to $2,000 per ton in 2021.

Palladium

Palladium is used widely in catalytic converters to curb harmful emissions from car exhaust.  Russia produces 40% of all palladium in the world, and the 2022 Russian invasion of Ukraine has rattled the palladium market.

Rhodium

Rhodium is used widely in automotive catalytic converters.  Many countries have agreed to the Paris climate accord to cut car emissions and have higher standards for exhaust.

South Africa produces 80-90% of Rhodium each year.  Russia is the second largest producer of rhodium but it is around 1%. The COVID-19 pandemic in South Africa caused the country to enact lockdown restrictions in March 2020 and again in December 2020 - March 2021. This affected the supply of Rhodium causing the price to increase.

Gold

Gold started to increase in price at the start of the COVID-19 pandemic as stocks sunk initially; gold is commonly seen as a safe haven from inflation and stock volatility. Gold crossed the $2,000 mark for the first time in August 2020 and again in March 2022.

Iron ore

China is the number one consumer of iron ore, importing 80% of all internationally traded iron ore. The price has been very volatile because of curbs the CCP has placed on the steel industry to meet emission standards. Australia, Brazil, and China are the top three producers of iron ore.

Cotton

In the Western United States there have been persistent droughts in the 2020s hurting cotton yields among other agricultural products.

See also
 1970s energy crisis
 1970s commodities boom
 2000s commodities boom
 2021–2023 inflation surge
 Commodity market
 List of commodity booms

References

Commodity booms
Open economy macroeconomics
2000s economic history
21st-century economic history